Palaeonictis ("ancient weasel") is an extinct genus of placental mammals from extinct subfamily Palaeonictinae within extinct family Oxyaenidae, that lived in Europe and North America from the late Paleocene to the early Eocene.

Description 
In life, it would have resembled a large modern wolverine. This predatory mammal had heavy jaws and blunt robust teeth more suited for crushing bones, than slicing meat. This meant that the plantigrade Palaeonictis was at least a part-time scavenger. This animal was the largest carnivore in its ecosystem. , P. occidentalis (the size of a bear) evolved into the smaller P. wingi (the size of a coyote) within 200,000 years in the early Eocene due to global warming (paleoclimatology). By the end of the early Eocene, Palaeonictis disappeared from North America, and by the early Eocene the last species of P. gigantea had vanished from Europe. In fact, the entire family Oxyaenidae had become extinct worldwide (although its sister group Hyaenodonta continued to thrive for a while). This is traditionally assumed to be due to increased competition from miacids and nimravids belonging to the more successful order Carnivora, which eventually replaced earlier carnivorous mammal clades in the later Neogene as the world's top predators, though no evidence of direct competition is known, and carnivorans may have simply filled vacated niches.

Phylogeny 
The phylogenetic relationships of genus Palaeonictis are shown in the following cladogram.

See also
 Mammal classification
 Palaeonictinae

References 

Oxyaenidae
Eocene mammals of Europe
Eocene mammals of North America
Paleocene mammals of North America
Paleocene first appearances
Eocene genus extinctions
Fossil taxa described in 1842
Prehistoric placental genera